Ben 10: Alien Swarm is a 2009 American superhero film directed by Alex Winter. It is based on the Cartoon Network animated series Ben 10: Alien Force and is a standalone sequel to 2007's Ben 10: Race Against Time. The film stars Ryan Kelley, Galadriel Stineman, Nathan Keyes, Alyssa Diaz, Herbert Siguenza, and Barry Corbin. The film held its world premiere in London on November 15, 2009, and premiered on Cartoon Network on November 25, 2009, where it was watched by 4.02 million viewers. The events of the film takes place between the second season's finale and the first episode of the third season of Ben 10: Alien Force due to the fact that Gwen and Kevin changed their clothes later in the movie.

Plot
The film opens as sixteen-year-old cousins Ben and Gwen Tennyson, and their friend, seventeen-year-old Kevin Levin, are negotiating with a group of black market dealers attempting to sell them alien nanochips, which are causing interference with the Omnitrix. One of them reveals herself to be Elena Validus, a childhood friend of Ben and Gwen. Elena explains that she had set up negotiations to lure Ben out into the open to seek his help in finding her abducted scientist father.

As Ben agrees to help her, the chips spring to life and attack, controlled by a man on a catwalk. The group fights them, and in the process the suspicious man and the dealers escape. While Elena claims she is not responsible for the attack, Kevin and Gwen are suspicious of her.

At their headquarters, the trio, along with Grandpa Max, study one of the chips salvaged from the fight, learning that they are a hybrid of organic and technological components. Elena, having followed the trio, breaks in and Max orders her to leave, explaining that Elena's father, Victor Validus, was an apprentice of his who was dishonorably discharged after stealing the original chips. Ben refuses to believe that Elena is like her father, and breaks ranks with his grandfather and teammates to help her.

While Max is away, Gwen and Kevin investigate Victor Validus and discover a video of Max interrogating Victor, in which Victor insists that "the Hive", the mind intelligence behind the chips, is coming to take over the planet as they are revealed to be able to possess people.

Meanwhile, Ben and Elena arrive at Victor's old laboratory. It has been cleared out by the Hive, but they find evidence that Victor was studying and upgrading the chips. Elena reveals that her father had become erratic before disappearing, and had stopped returning home. He also appears to be the man from the rafters controlling the chips. A mob under the control of the chips ambush Ben and Elena, forcing them to retreat. The Omnitrix again experiences interference around the chips and keeps Ben from transforming, but Ben utilizes a scanning function on it to temporarily repel the mob and allow him and Elena to escape. They head to the Ship-It building to investigate further, though Ben is now somewhat suspicious of Elena himself, realizing the mob expected him and Elena to go to the lab and set a trap for them. Ben finds an order slip made out for that day, when Elena claimed that Victor had already been missing for weeks.

Gwen and Kevin, having reached the building first, are too late to stop the distribution of the chips. Instead, they are met by one of the Ship-It employees, who is also under the chips' control. He summons another larger chip swarm, now capable of forming solid, weaponizable shapes, to attack Gwen and Kevin, damaging Kevin's car during a lengthy chase. Ben, upon joining them, uses Humongousaur to defeat the swarm, destroying Kevin's car in the process.

By the time they return to headquarters, the chips have spread across the globe, and number in the millions. Gwen realizes the swarm's new ability is a sign that they can adapt to threats and become smarter. The group also deduces the chips have a queen, as the chip's hosts have mentioned her. They believed that they can stop the chips by destroying her, but during their search, Max is possessed. Pulling together, the group notice that while world population centers are all infected, Barren Rock, Missouri, has the highest concentration, an apparent anomaly in their distribution.

Infiltrating the factory, populated by multiple infected, including Max, the group discovers that the Queen infected Elena's father, and his body is being used as a hive to rapidly mass-produce the chips. Fearing being possessed by the chips while in his alien forms, Ben uses the Omnitrix to transform into a new alien that he calls "Nanomech",    but before he could turn into it he was instead shrunken down as a human. He then notices the giant feet of Kevin and Gwen in front of him. Gwen begins to scrap her gigantic heavy foot across the floor which causes a loud scratching sound which goes to show the massive difference in both size and mass between Gwen and now her shrunken cousin. Ben realises that he is small then after a few seconds then finally transforms into Nanomech, which was created by scanning the DNA of the chips. He flies into Victor's head and battles the Queen, who briefly tries to assert dominance on him, though he resists, while Gwen, Kevin, and Elena fight the infected. As the dormant chips in the factory activate, Nanomech uses the chips ability to adapt to overwhelm and destroy the Queen, freeing everyone from the chips' control.

In the aftermath, Max, after apologizing to Victor, decides to retire and leave his position as leader to Ben, but Ben refuses to allow him to do so. The film ends as Ben, Gwen, Kevin, and Elena drive home.

Cast
 Ryan Kelley as Benjamin "Ben" Kirby Tennyson
 Galadriel Stineman as Gwendolyn "Gwen" Catherine Tennyson
 Nathan Keyes as Kevin Levin
 Alyssa Diaz as Elena Validus
 Herbert Siguenza as Victor Validus
 Barry Corbin as Max Tennyson
 Dee Bradley Baker as Big Chill, Humungousaur (voice)
 Alex Winter as Nanomech (voice)
 Wendy Cutler as The Queen (voice)
 Patrick Cox as Big Ed

Production

Major hurdles for film's initial production stage included the 2007-2008 Writers Guild of America strike as well as the threat of strikes by other guilds. Prior to a potential Directors Guild of America strike, Winter began creating animatics of action sequences featuring characters rejected for the 2007 film. This would allow animators to complete sequences if the Directors Guild of America went on strike in January 2008, which ultimately did not happen. Winter considered making a small project in between Ben 10 and the movie, but decided against the idea, saying "you have your baby and you don't want someone else to take it".

Inspired by its use in Sam Raimi's Spider-Man, three action sequences in Ben 10: Alien Swarm were shot using IMAX cameras. Although screenwriters John Turman and James Krieg suggested that the IMAX footage would be 3D, Winter late said he found 3D too gimmicky. Winter added that shooting in IMAX was easier than using stereoscopic cameras.

Cartoon Network became more involved in the designs of the aliens than the company was for Ben 10. The company along with Boomerang, suggested to the filmmakers that combining aliens be the main draw for the movie.

The score to Ben 10: Alien Swarm was composed by Michael Wandmacher, who reunited with director Alex Winter to record his score with a 71-piece ensemble of the Northwest Sinfonia and Blue Man Group at the Bastyr University. Many songs were featured in the film including: 'Sharks' by Red Fang, 'A Little Faster' by There For Tomorrow, 'Flyentology' by EL-P, 'Healer' by Torche, 'Rescue Me' by Hawthorne Heights. Also the song 'Tell Me' by Story Of The Year was featured in the second trailer of the film.

Reception

Accolades
Ben 10: Alien Swarm was nominated for 2010 Emmys for Outstanding Special Visual Effects for a Miniseries, Special or Movie - 2010.

References

External links
 

2009 television films
2009 films
2009 science fiction action films
2000s superhero films
American action adventure films
Canadian action adventure films
Canadian science fiction action films
Films set in the United States
Films based on television series
Television films based on television series
Live-action films based on animated series
American superhero films
Television sequel films
Ben 10 films
American films with live action and animation
American science fiction action films
Films set in 2010
Films directed by Alex Winter
Films with screenplays by John Turman
Films scored by Michael Wandmacher
Warner Bros. films
Films set in Atlanta
2000s English-language films
2000s American films
2000s Canadian films